Prince Joseph Wenzel of Liechtenstein, Count of Rietberg (Joseph Wenzel Maximilian Maria; born 24 May 1995) is the eldest child of Alois, Hereditary Prince of Liechtenstein, and his wife Sophie, He is also the eldest grandchild of the current ruling prince of Liechtenstein, Hans-Adam II.

He is second in the line of succession to the Liechtensteiner throne through his father.

Biography
Prince Joseph Wenzel was born on 24 May 1995 at the Portland Hospital in the West End of London to Hereditary Prince Alois and his wife Hereditary Princess Sophie (née Duchess Sophie in Bavaria). He has three younger siblings: Princess Marie Caroline, Prince Georg and Prince Nikolaus. The Prince is named Joseph Wenzel Maximilian Maria after his ancestor Joseph Wenzel I, Prince of Liechtenstein, his maternal grandfather Prince Max, Duke in Bavaria, his paternal uncle and godfather Prince Maximilian of Liechtenstein. He is informally known as Prince Wenzel.

Prince Joseph Wenzel was educated at Malvern College, a coeducational boarding school in Worcestershire, England. He graduated from Malvern College in 2014. He spent a gap year pursuing an internship at the United States Senate and travelling to Peru and Bolivia.

Dynastic ties
Since birth, Joseph Wenzel has born the titles "Prince of Liechtenstein" and "Count of Rietberg."  He is second in line for the throne of Liechtenstein, preceded only by his father, who has been regent since 15 August 2004. However, Joseph Wenzel's grandfather Prince Hans-Adam II formally remains head of state and of the Princely House of Liechtenstein. Upon the accession of his father, Joseph Wenzel would become the hereditary prince, i.e. the heir apparent to the throne.

Joseph Wenzel is also third in line in the Jacobite succession as successor to the current heir, his maternal grand-uncle Franz, Duke of Bavaria.

References and notes

1995 births
Living people
Princes of Liechtenstein
Liechtenstein Roman Catholics
People educated at Malvern College
People from London